John Dufty Lasher (15 November 1932 – 17 June 2015) was a New Zealand rugby league footballer who represented New Zealand.

Playing career
Lasher played for Richmond and represented Auckland.

In 1956 he was part of the New Zealand national rugby league team tour of Australia, but he did not play in any of the test matches.

Lasher was part of the Auckland side that defeated Great Britain 46-13 on 13 August at Carlaw Park. This was the first televised rugby league match in New Zealand as one hour of edited highlights were shown on AKTV2 that night and other regional channels showed the highlights the following week.

Later years
Lasher also was a sailor and was an international helmsman.

In 2013 he was named in Richmond’s team of the century. He died on 17 June 2015.

References

1932 births
2015 deaths
New Zealand rugby league players
New Zealand national rugby league team players
Auckland rugby league team players
Rugby league hookers
Richmond Bulldogs players